Song Ji-yeong (born 1 December 1982) is a South Korean sports shooter. She competed in two events at the 2000 Summer Olympics.

References

1982 births
Living people
South Korean female sport shooters
Olympic shooters of South Korea
Shooters at the 2000 Summer Olympics
Place of birth missing (living people)